Willamette fleabane is a common name for several plants and may refer to:

Erigeron decumbens
Erigeron robustior